This is a list of butterflies of the Northern Mariana Islands.

Hesperiidae

Hesperiinae
Erionota thrax (Linnaeus, 1767)

Papilionidae

Papilioninae
Papilio xuthus Linnaeus, 1767
Papilio polytes palewensis Nakamura, 1933

Pieridae

Coliadinae
Catopsilia pomona (Fabricius, 1775)
Eurema blanda kishidai Yata, 1994

Lycaenidae

Polyommatinae
Lampides boeticus (Linnaeus, 1767)
Zizula hylax dampierensis (Rothschild, 1915)
Luthrodes pandava (Horsfield, 1829)

Nymphalidae

Danainae
Tirumala hamata hamata (Macleay, 1826)
Danaus plexippus plexippus (Linnaeus, 1758)
Euploea eunice kadu (von Eschscholtz, 1821)
Euploea algea eleutho (Quoy & Gaimard, 1824)

Satyrinae
Melanitis leda ponapensis Mathew, 1889
Ypthima baldus evanescens (Butler, 1881)

Nymphalinae
Hypolimnas antilope anomala (Wallace, 1869)
Hypolimnas octocula marianensis Fruhstorfer, 1912
Hypolimnas bolina nerina (Fabricius, 1775)

Heliconiinae
Vagrans egestina (Quoy & Gaimard, 1824)

References

'|butterflies
Northern Mariana
Northern Mariana Islands
butterflies
Northern Mariana Islands
'|Northern Mariana
'|Northern Mariana